Justice Saffold may refer to:

Benjamin F. Saffold (1826–1889), associate justice of the Alabama Supreme Court
Reuben Saffold (1788–1847), associate justice and chief justice of the Alabama Supreme Court

See also
Jacob Safford (1827–1885), associate justice of the Kansas Supreme Court